McEleney is a surname. Notable people with the surname include:

John J. McEleney (1895–1986), American Catholic prelate and academic
Justine McEleney (born 1994), British beauty pageant winner
Patrick McEleney (born 1992), Irish footballer
Shane McEleney (born 1991), Irish footballer